I-mutation (also known as umlaut, front mutation, i-umlaut, i/j-mutation or i/j-umlaut) is a type of sound change in which a back vowel is fronted or a front vowel is raised if the following syllable contains ,  or  (a voiced palatal approximant, sometimes called yod, the sound of English  in yes). It is a category of regressive metaphony, or vowel harmony.

Germanic languages

I-mutation took place separately in the various Germanic languages from around 450 or 500 AD in the North Sea area and affected all the early languages, except for Gothic. It seems to have taken effect earliest and most completely in Old English and Old Norse. It took place later in Old High German; by 900, its effects are consistently visible only in the spelling of Germanic .

Other languages
I-mutation exists in many other languages but is often referred to by different names. However, in the Romance languages, it is more commonly called metaphony (from Ancient Greek, meaning "process of changing sounds", of which German umlaut is a translation). Meanwhile, in Celtic languages, it is referred to as affection. A type of i-mutation is also observed in Anatolian languages, including Hittite, Luwian, Lycian and Lydian.

Korean language 

In Middle Korean, I-backward-sequenced vowels (ㅐ, ㅔ, ㅚ, ㅟ, ㅢ, ...) were diphthongs, i.e. ㅐ , ㅔ , ㅚ , ㅟ , ㅢ . However, in early modern Korean, they are monophthongized by umlaut, i.e. ㅐ , ㅔ , ㅚ , ㅟ  with only one exception: ㅢ.

In modern Korean language, there are two types of I-mutation, or I-assimilation: I-forward-assimilation (ㅣ 순행 동화) and I-backward-assimilation (ㅣ 역행 동화). Assimilation occurs when ㅣ is in front of (forward) or behind (backward) the syllable. In standard Korean, only a few words are allowed to assimilate, however, exceptions are often observed in some dialects and casual usage. I-forward-assimilation adds  sound, but I-backward-assimilation causes vowel to umlaut.
 Forward: 피어 (to bloom)  → 피여 , 아니오 (no)  → 아니요 
 Backward: 남비 (pot)  → 냄비 , (Western Korean dialect) 어미 (mother)  → 에미 , 고기 (meat)  → 괴기

See also
 Old English phonology

References

Sound laws
Vowel shifts
Germanic languages